Jahine Amid Arnold (born June 19, 1973) is a former National Football League (NFL) wide receiver.

Professional career
He was drafted by the Pittsburgh Steelers in 1996. As a member of the Steelers, Arnold was primarily used for kick returns. In his two seasons with the Steelers, Arnold appeared in twelve games.

After being cut by the Steelers, Arnold played one game with the Green Bay Packers but did not record any yardage.

Arnold was drafted by the XFL's Birmingham Thunderbolts on the second day of the draft and was chosen 194th overall. On March 16, 2001, Arnold was waived by the Thunderbolts and was claimed by the Memphis Maniax. In the XFL's lone season, Arnold played two games, both with the Maniax. He finished with 10 yards receiving 48 yards on returned kickoffs, and 50 yards on returned punts.

Arnold also played several years of arena football before retiring in 2004.

Personal
Arnold has been living in Tampa, FL since 1999. He was diagnosed in August 2007 with a progressive liver disease known as Primary Sclerosing Cholangitis, which is the same ailment that claimed the life of Pro Football Hall of Fame running back Walter Payton in 1999.

References

External links
Just Sports Stats
Jahine Arnold: Give To Live (personal blog)
http://www.pro-football-reference.com/players/ArnoJa00.htm
http://www.footballdb.com/players/jahine-arnold-arnolja01
http://www.jt-sw.com/football/pro/players.nsf/ID/07740010

1973 births
Living people
People from Rockville, Connecticut
American football wide receivers
Fresno State Bulldogs football players
Pittsburgh Steelers players
Green Bay Packers players
Tampa Bay Storm players
Los Angeles Avengers players
Austin Wranglers players
Memphis Maniax players